Richard Starkie was a British doctor who was charged with distributing illegal narcotics while providing abortions in 1921. Starkie, a former police surgeon, began illegally performing abortions on women during the early 1900s. He continued providing abortions until his arrest on 17 July 1921, and was charged with administering narcotics for the purpose of providing an abortion for a married woman as well as prior abortions for four unmarried patients. Although acquitted on abortion charges, he was found guilty for administering drugs and sentenced to nine months imprisonment at Wormwood Scrubs Prison. He was reportedly met by about 600 of his former patients following his release.

Further reading
Browne, Douglas G. and E.V. Tullett. The Scalpel of Scotland Yard. New York: E.P. Dutton, 1952.

Year of birth missing
Year of death missing
British abortion providers
20th-century British criminals